Thakuri is a Royal tribes of Nepal. It consists of the historical ruling class, and is made up of the descendants of the Great Khasa Malla kingdom rulers of the Baisi and Chaubisi principalities. The former royal family of Nepal also belong to this tribe.

Etymology
Nepali sociologist Harka Bahadur Gurung noted that the Thakuri is the Nepalese version of the Hindi word Thakur which means 'master of the estate'. Thakuris of Nepal are also associated with some territory inherited from the days of Baisi and Chaubisi principalities and the term Thakurai actually refers to 'fiefdom'.

Origins
Thakuris traditionally constituted the ruling and warrior classes, and claimed ancient royal descent Thakuris are a high socio-political group considered to have arisen from intermarriage between Khas, Magars, and perhaps Indian Rajput immigrants. The 1854 Muluki Ain (Legal Code) refers Thakuris by the term Rajputs despite being descended from the local Nepalese tribes. Many historians contended that the theory of Rajput descent was used for political purposes by the various ruling families of Nepal. The Thakuri Shah dynasty of Gorkha Kingdom and later Kingdom of Nepal, descended from the Magar tribe despite their claim of descent from Chittor Rajputs as per Scottish contemporary historian Francis Buchanan-Hamilton. Historian Hamilton further states the origins from Rajputs of Chittor is "a mere fable." Historian Mahesh Chandra Regmi contends that "Each ruling dynasty in Nepal has tried to connect its lineage with well known dynasties of India." One of the Thakuri Shah ruler of Gorkha, King Ram Shah, also attempted to forge recognition of kinship relations from the Ranas of Udaypur.

Society
Thakuris constitute the aristocracy and possess the high social, ritual and political status. Thakuris are politically and socially ahead of others. Traditionally, the Thakuris' main occupations involved government, agriculture and military. Thakuri traditionally constituted the ruling and warrior classes. Most of the Thakuris are agriculturalists in Western Nepal except few aristrocratic families in the capital city. The children born from a Brahman father and a Thakuri mother is categorized into a new caste called "Hamal". 

The Thakuris of Palpa speak Magar language more fluently than Nepali language and the local Thakuris generally drink chyang in the evenings with Magars. In the Jhirubas village of Palpa, Magars have married Thakuris and vice versa.

Thakuri family and dynasties 
The ruling Shah dynasty of Gorkha Kingdom and later Kingdom of Nepal are ranked among Thakuris. 

The Pal Thakuri the Katyuri kings of Darchula ( Dethala, Uku, Nepal village ) and Doti districts of Far-Western Development Region, Nepal

Notable Thakuri surnames 
In alphabetical order, the commonly known Thakuri surnames are:
 Bam
 Chand
 Khand
 Malla
 Pal
Uchai
 Sen
 Shah (not to be confused with Sah of Terai, Shah caste in Kumaon region in Uttarakhand State of India)
 Shahi
 Singh
Simha

Of these, Chand, Bam, Malla, and Pal are also associated with Kumaon/Kuramanchal kingdom.

Unproven Thakuri Claimants
The following surnames have claim Thakuri status but are not corroborated by governmental inclusivity organizations or historical sources:
 Kunwar
 Thagunna
 Thakurathi
 Rana /Jabara / Jang Bahadur Rana / JBR
 Rawal
 Bogati
 Deuba

See also
Prithvi Narayan Shah
Baise Rajya (Twenty-Two Principalities)
Khasa Kingdom
Chand Kings
Jaya Prithvi Bahadur Singh
Katyuri Kings

References

Books

 
Ethnic groups in Nepal
Castes